Brian O'Shea may refer to:

 Brian O'Shea (politician) (born 1944), Irish Labour Party politician
 Brian O'Shea (boxer), former American boxer, referee, and judge